The Hunter's Hill Stone, otherwise known as the Glamis 1 Stone, is a Class II Pictish standing stone at Hunter's Hill to the south east of Glamis village, Angus, Scotland.

Location

The cross slab is located in woodland on the north slope of Hunter's Hill, to the south east of Glamis village, immediately south of the A94 road.

Description

The slab is carved on the cross face in relief, and the rear face bears incised symbols. It falls into John Romilly Allen and Joseph Anderson's classification system as a class II stone.

Relationship with other stones
The Hunter's Hill stone belongs to the Aberlemno School of Pictish sculpture as extended by Laing from Ross Trench Jellicoe's original proposed list. In addition to the Glamis manse stone, stones in the Aberlemno School include Aberlemno 2 (the Kirkyard Stone), Aberlemno 3, Menmuir 1, Kirriemuir 1, Monifieth 2, Eassie, Rossie Priory, and the Glamis Manse Stone (Glamis 2).

See also

 Glamis Manse Stone (Glamis 2)

References

Pictish stones
Pictish stones in Angus, Scotland